Jani is a male given name, particularly common in Finland and Hungary. It is derived from the Hebrew Yohanan and is hence a cognate of the English John.

Given names

List of people with given name Jani
Jani Allan
Jani Beg
Jani Christou
Jani Hurme
Jani Kautto
Jani Lajunen
Jani Lane
Jani Liimatainen
Jani Lyyski
Jani Rita
Jani Sievinen
Jani Soininen
Jani Stefanovic
Jani Sullanmaa
Jani Virtanen
Jani Vreto

See also 
Jāņi

References

Given names
Finnish masculine given names